Ružić may refer to:

Places 
 Ružić, Croatia, a village and a municipality in the Šibenik-Knin County, Croatia
 Ružić (Vladičin Han), a village in southern Serbia

People 
 Tomislav Ružić (born 1979), Croatian basketball player
 Milan Ružić (1955–2014), Croatian football player
 Branko Ružić (1919–1997), Croatian painter, sculptor and professor
 Branko Ružić (born 1975), Serbian politician
 Dushan Ruzic (born 1982), Australian baseball pitcher
 Jovan Ružić (1898–1973), Serbian footballer

See also

Ružići (disambiguation) (plural form)

Croatian surnames